The Pazhassi Dam also called Kulur Barrage is a stone masonry diversion structure in Kannur district, Kerala, India. It is named after king Pazhassi Raja, a patriot who died a heroic death in the war. The dam is constructed across the west flowing Bavali river near Veliyambra. It was commissioned by Prime Minister Morarji Desai in 1979. The water from this dam also meets the drinking water requirement of Kannur district. The dam site and the reservoir are famous for their scenic beauty.

Topography
The dam is built at Kuyiloor across the Bavali River, in the basin of the West flowing rivers from Tadri to Kanyakumari. The nearest towns to the dam site are Mattanur and Iritty.

Features

While the dam was completed in 1978, its irrigation component was completed in 1979. The network of canals includes six branch canals of  total length and 32 distributaries of  total length. The entire command is covered under the Command Area Development Programme (CADP) of the Ministry of Water Resources, Government of India and is being monitored since 2003.

Failure of gates
On 7 August 2012, some of the gates of the barrage failed to open, causing the flood waters to overflow the barrage for 20 hours. There was no damage to life or the dam structure, but minor property and crop loss occurred. The gates were repaired at a cost of Rs 70 million.

Pazhassi Dam Gardens

See also
List of dams and reservoirs in India

References

External links

Dams completed in 1979
Dams in Kerala
Buildings and structures in Kannur district
1979 establishments in Kerala
20th-century architecture in India